Kódjo Kassé Alphonse (born 26 May 1993) is an Ivorian professional football player who plays for Taraz in the Kazakhstan Premier League.

Career 
He made his professional debut in the Segunda Liga for Oliveirense on 14 September 2013 in a game against Tondela.

On 25 February 2019, Kódjo signed for Ararat-Armenia. On 16 October, Kódjo left Ararat-Armenia by mutual consent after playing 55 games and scoring 3 goals for the club.

On 20 February 2021, FC Taraz announced the signing of Kódjo.

Career statistics

Club

Honours

Club 
Ararat-Armenia
 Armenian Premier League (2): 2018–19, 2019–20
 Armenian Supercup (1): 2019

References

External links
 
 

1993 births
Living people
Ivorian footballers
Footballers from Abidjan
Primeira Liga players
Liga Portugal 2 players
Segunda Divisão players
Armenian Premier League players
Gil Vicente F.C. players
U.D. Oliveirense players
Académico de Viseu F.C. players
C.D. Feirense players
FC Ararat-Armenia players
Ivorian expatriate footballers
Expatriate footballers in Portugal
Expatriate footballers in Armenia
Ivorian expatriate sportspeople in Portugal
Association football midfielders